The Butterfly Returns was a concert residency by American singer-songwriter Mariah Carey at Caesars Palace in Las Vegas. It began on July 5, 2018 and concluded on February 29, 2020. This was Carey's second concert residency placed in Las Vegas since #1 to Infinity (2015-2017). From the first nineteen of the twenty-five dates, the residency grossed $7.1 million and was attended by over 48,000 people.

Background 
Carey announced the residency on April 30, 2018 on Twitter, marking her fourth concert residency. The show's set list was arranged by Carey, according to fans' demands on Twitter and polls. This set list differed from the one of her previous residency, #1 to Infinity, as it included lesser-known songs by the singer that did not reach number-one on the Billboard Hot 100. For shows in 2018, the set list consisted of eighteen songs, including duets with frequent collaborators Daniel Moore and Trey Lorenz, with the 2019 leg seeing slight changes to the set. During the residency, Carey completed two concert tours and another residency. She returned to Vegas in February 2020, with a new set list, featuring a "Car Ride" medley, consisting of eight songs, and new tracks from her fifteenth studio album, Caution.

Set lists 
{{hidden
| headercss = background: #FFE6FF; font-size: 100%; width: 100%;
| contentcss = text-align: left; font-size: 100%; width: 100%;
| header = 2018
| content = The following set list is obtained from the July 5, 2018 concert.

"Fly Away (Butterfly Reprise)" (Introduction)
 "Honey"
"Shake It Off"
 "Make It Happen"
"Make It Happen Medley" (Intermission) (contains a reprise of "Make It Happen" and excerpts from "Sweetheart", "Say Somethin'", "Loverboy", and "Dreamlover")
"Fantasy" (Bad Boy Fantasy Remix)
"Always Be My Baby"
"Vision of Love"
"Emotions"
"Obsessed" (Intermission)
"Beautiful" (with Daniel Moore)
"I'll Be There" (with Trey Lorenz)
"One Sweet Day" (with Trey Lorenz)
"Can't Let Go"
"Can't Take That Away (Mariah's Theme)"
"My All"
"It's Like That" (contains elements of "Hollis Crew" and "Sucker M.C.'s")
"Love Hangover" / "Heartbreaker"
"Touch My Body"
"We Belong Together"
Encore
"Hero"
"Butterfly" (Outro)
}}
{{hidden
| headercss = background: #FFE6FF; font-size: 100%; width: 100%;
| contentcss = text-align: left; font-size: 100%; width: 100%;
| header = 2019
| content = The following set list is obtained from the February 13, 2019 concert.

"Fly Away (Butterfly Reprise)" (Introduction)
 "Honey"
"Shake It Off"
 "Make It Happen"
"Make It Happen Medley" (Intermission) (contains a reprise of "Make It Happen" and excerpts from "Sweetheart", "Say Somethin'", "Loverboy", and "Dreamlover")
"Fantasy" (Bad Boy Fantasy Remix)
"Always Be My Baby"
"Love Takes Time"
"Emotions"
"Emotionless" (Intermission)
"Beautiful"
"One Sweet Day" (with Trey Lorenz)
"With You"
"Fly Like a Bird"
"My All"
"I'll Be Loving U Long Time" (Intermission)
"It's Like That" (contains elements of "Hollis Crew" and "Sucker M.C.'s")
"Love Hangover" / "Heartbreaker"
"Touch My Body"
"We Belong Together" (contains elements of DJ Clue Remix)
Encore
"Hero"
"Butterfly" (Outro)
}}
{{hidden
| headercss = background: #FFE6FF; font-size: 100%; width: 100%;
| contentcss = text-align: left; font-size: 100%; width: 100%;
| header = 2020
| content = The following set list is obtained from the February 15, 2020 concert.

"Fly Away (Butterfly Reprise)" (Introduction)
"Emotions"
"Shake It Off"
 "Make It Happen"
"Make It Happen Medley" (Intermission) (contains a reprise of "Make It Happen" and excerpts from "Sweetheart", "Loverboy", and "Dreamlover")
"Fantasy" (Bad Boy Fantasy Remix)
"Obsessed"
"Love Takes Time"
"Always Be My Baby" (contains elements of Mr. Dupri Mix)
"Beautiful"  (with Daniel Moore)
"I'll Be There" (with Trey Lorenz)
"Endless Love" (with Trey Lorenz)
"My All"
"I'll Be Loving U Long Time" (Intermission)
"It's Like That" (contains elements of "Hollis Crew" and "Sucker M.C.'s")
 "A No No" / "Honey" / "I'm That Chick" / "Heartbreaker" / "Crybaby" / "Breakdown" / "Say Somethin'" / "I Know What You Want"
"Touch My Body"
"We Belong Together" (contains elements of Desert Storm Remix)
Encore
"Hero"
}}

Shows

Notes

References

2018 concert residencies
2019 concert residencies
2020 concert residencies
Concert residencies in the Las Vegas Valley
Mariah Carey concert residencies
Caesars Palace